Amadis is an opera in three acts with prologue by Jules Massenet to a French libretto by Jules Claretie based on the Spanish knight-errantry romance Amadis de Gaula, originally of Portuguese origin, by Garci Rodríguez de Montalvo.

It was first performed at the Opéra de Monte-Carlo on 1 April 1922, nearly ten years after Massenet's death. Massenet had started to compose the piece in 1895 but shelved it and completed it clandestinely in the last years of his life. Amadis is one of three operas by Massenet to have been premiered posthumously; the others are Panurge (1913) and Cléopâtre (1914).

Amadis has gained no lasting popularity but was revived (and recorded on the Koch Swann label) during the Massenet Festival in Saint-Étienne, France in 1988.

Roles

Synopsis
The story takes place in ancient Brittany and concerns the brothers Amadis and Galaor, separated at birth. Amadis kills Galaor in the final scene in a duel over the princess Floriane. When Amadis discovers magic stones around Galaor's neck identical to those given to him and his long lost brother by their dying mother, he realizes it is his brother he has killed.

References

External links

Operas
Operas by Jules Massenet
French-language operas
1922 operas
Opera world premieres at the Opéra de Monte-Carlo
Operas set in France
Operas based on literature